Richard C. Lester (born 24 March 1949 in Wallingford, Berkshire) is a retired British rower who competed in the 1976 Summer Olympics.

Rowing career
Lester was selected by Great Britain as part of the coxed four at the 1975 World Rowing Championships in Nottingham, the four just missed out on a medal finishing in fourth place in the A final. In 1976 he was rowed at the Olympic Games in Montreal, he was a crew member of the British boat with John Yallop, Timothy Crooks, Hugh Matheson, David Maxwell, Jim Clark, Frederick Smallbone, Lenny Robertson and Patrick Sweeney, which won the silver medal in the men's eight.

Personal life
He is the younger brother of Ken Lester.

References

 profile

1949 births
Living people
English male rowers
British male rowers
Olympic rowers of Great Britain
Rowers at the 1976 Summer Olympics
Olympic silver medallists for Great Britain
Stewards of Henley Royal Regatta
Olympic medalists in rowing
Medalists at the 1976 Summer Olympics